Gonepteryx maderensis, the Madeira brimstone, is a species of butterfly in the family Pieridae. It is endemic to Madeira. Its natural habitat is temperate forests. It is threatened by habitat loss.

References

Gonepteryx
Butterflies of Africa
Arthropods of Madeira
Endemic fauna of Madeira
Butterflies described in 1862
Taxa named by Baron Cajetan von Felder
Taxonomy articles created by Polbot